Center for Eurasian Strategic Studies (Avrasya Stratejik Araştırmalar Merkezi; ASAM) is a far right, nationalist think tank based in Turkey.

The Institute for Armenian Research, created to deny recognition of the Armenian genocide, is referred to as its subsidiary.

According to Taner Akcam, the ASAM is "the propaganda center of the official Turkish denial policy on genocide".

Publications 
ASAM has been involved in the publication of the following periodicals:

 Stratejik Analiz : aylık uluslararası i̇lişkiler ve stratejik araştırmalar dergisi (2000- ) 
 Eurasian File 
 Review of International Affairs  
 Ankara Papers 
 Review of Armenian Studies  / Ermeni Araştırmaları

References

External links 
 
 Center for Eurasian Studies

Think tanks based in Turkey
Armenian genocide denial